Depths of Wikipedia is a group of social media accounts dedicated to highlighting "strange", "obscure", and "interesting" facts from Wikipedia. Created on Instagram in 2020 by Annie Rauwerda, a student at the University of Michigan, the account shares excerpts from various Wikipedia articles on humorous or absurd topics.

Rauwerda has additionally hosted a Wikipedia editing workshop and live comedy shows in connection with Depths of Wikipedia.

Creation 

Depths of Wikipedia, an Instagram account, was created in April 2020 by Annie Rauwerda, a neuroscience major at the University of Michigan. She created the account as a personal project at the beginning of the COVID-19 pandemic, intending to share strange, surprising, and interesting facts from the English Wikipedia among friends. According to Rauwerda, the project was inspired by a collage of excerpts from Wikipedia that she had made for a friend's zine, and by a photograph from the Wikipedia article on cow tipping. She had been interested in Wikipedia before beginning the project, spending time reading it as a child and Wikiracing with friends in middle and high school.

Instagram influencer Caroline Calloway brought Depths of Wikipedia its first wave of followers, publicizing the account's posts positively after resolving an incident in which Rauwerda had posted about Calloway's Wikipedia page.

After her Instagram account gained followers, Rauwerda created TikTok and Twitter accounts of the same name, and launched a newsletter covering unusual Wikipedia pages in greater detail.

Activity 

Depths of Wikipedia has highlighted articles on topics including exploding trousers, Nuclear Gandhi, chess on a really big board, and sexually active popes.

According to Rauwerda, she often receives submissions of Wikipedia articles to feature, but is selective in choosing which to post. In October 2021, she said she was getting "probably 30 to 50 user submissions per day".

A Wikipedia editor herself, Rauwerda has hosted an edit-a-thon, welcoming new contributions to the encyclopedia, as well as live comedy shows based on trivia from Wikipedia.

Reception 
Notable followers of the Depths of Wikipedia account include Neil Gaiman, John Mayer, Troye Sivan, and Olivia Wilde.

According to Heather Woods, a professor of rhetoric and technology at Kansas State University, Depths of Wikipedia "makes the internet feel smaller" by "offering attractive—or sometimes hilariously unattractive—entry points to internet culture". Zachary McCune, the brand director of the Wikimedia Foundation, which funds and hosts Wikipedia, called the account "a place where Wikipedia comes to life, like an after-hours tour of the best of Wikipedia".

References

Further reading

External links 
 
 
 
 The bizarre and wonderful Depths of Wikipedia, video at ABC News

2020 establishments in Michigan
Instagram accounts
Internet humor
Social media accounts
Social media influencers
Twitter accounts
Weird Twitter
Works about Wikipedia